This is a list of Moldova international footballers who have played at least 20 matches for the Moldova national football team. There are in total 73 players on the list.

Alexandru Epureanu is the player with the most appearances for Moldova. He made his debut in a 2–0 UEFA Euro 2008 qualifying loss against Norway on 6 September 2006, and has since been a regular in the national team, wearing the captain's armband on several occasions. In September 2019, Epureanu retired from the national team due to a knee injury. However, he returned in August 2020, and is still active for Moldova. On 31 March 2021, he made his 100th appearance for Moldova in a 2022 FIFA World Cup qualification match against Israel.

Victor Golovatenco is in second place with 79 appearances, followed by Radu Rebeja with 74 appearances.

Serghei Cleșcenco is the all-time top goalscorer of the Moldova national team. He scored 11 goals in 69 matches between 1991 and 2006.

Moldova's first ever match was a friendly match against Georgia on 2 July 1991. Five of the players on this list took part in the match, including Radu Rebeja and Serghei Cleșcenco.

Moldova have never qualified for the FIFA World Cup or the UEFA European Championship, so the matches listed below are either qualifying matches for those two tournaments, UEFA Nations League matches, or friendly matches.

Key

The list is initially ordered by number of appearances, then goals, and then alphabetically by surname.
Only players with at least 20 appearances in official matches are listed.
Appearances and goals are composed of FIFA World Cup qualification, UEFA European Championship qualifying and UEFA Nations League matches, as well as numerous international friendly matches.
Statistics are correct as of the match played on 21 January 2022.

List

References

External links
Moldova international footballers on eu-football.info
Moldova international footballers on rsssf.com

 
Association football player non-biographical articles